The Sacred Heart Cathedral also alternatively called the Cathedral of the Seven Sorrows of Mary is a religious building located in the city of Ningbo in Zhejiang Province of the People's Republic of China.

It served as the headquarters of the Diocese of Ningbo (Dioecesis Nimpuovensis, 天主教宁波教区) which was created on 11 April 1946. It should not be confused with the Cathedral of Our Lady of the Assumption current seat of the diocese.

Its history began as the church the seven sorrows of Mary in 1872 being built in the Gothic style by the French Vincentians, as the seat of the Apostolic Vicariate of Chekiang dependent Fuchow for the time being elevated to cathedral in 1876; and closed in 1963; for a few years later reopen under another name in 1980; It was declared a national heritage in 2006; and finally it was partially destroyed by fire on July 28, 2014.
As of 2018, the cathedral is fully restored.

See also
Roman Catholicism in China
Sacred Heart Cathedral (disambiguation)

References

Churches in Zhejiang
Roman Catholic cathedrals in China
Buildings and structures in Ningbo
Roman Catholic churches completed in 1872
2014 fires in Asia
2014 disasters in China
July 2014 events in China
19th-century Roman Catholic church buildings in China